Esfanaj (also Romanized as Esfanāj and Esfenāj; also known as Isfanaj and Ispanag) is a village in Zanjanrud-e Pain Rural District, Zanjanrud District, Zanjan County, Zanjan Province, Iran. At the 2006 census, its population was 426, in 104 families.

References 

Populated places in Zanjan County